Stanisław Dygat (5 December 1914, Warsaw – 29 January 1978, Warsaw) was a Polish writer. His most famous novel, "Jezioro Bodeńskie" ("Lake Constance"), was written during World War II and published in 1946. All of his works are partly autobiographical (ex. because of his French origin, he was an internee in Constance in 1939).

Selected novels
 1946 - Jezioro Bodeńskie (Lake Constance, in 1986 a film based on the book was released - director: Janusz Zaorski),
 1948 – Pożegnania (Farewells, in 1958 a film based on the book was released - director: Wojciech Jerzy Has),
 1958 – Podróż ("Journey"), 
 1965 – Disneyland 
 1973 – Dworzec w Monachium ("Railway station in Munich").

References 

Polish male novelists
1914 births
1978 deaths
Burials at Powązki Cemetery
20th-century Polish novelists
20th-century Polish male writers